Virbia marginata is a moth in the family Erebidae. It was described by Herbert Druce in 1885. It is found in Mexico, Guatemala, Honduras, New Mexico and Arizona.

The length of the forewings is about 10 mm for males and 11 mm for females. The male forewings are clay colored and the hindwings are yellow ocher. The female forewings are cinnamon with a faint olive brown discal spot. The hindwings are flesh ochre.

References

Moths described in 1885
marginata